The 1965 Lady Wigram Trophy was a motor race held at the Wigram Airfield Circuit on 23 January 1965. It was the fourteenth Lady Wigram Trophy to be held and was won by Jim Clark driving the Lotus 32B in what was the fastest race in the history of the Lady Wigram Trophy.

Report 
Through light rain, the practice times on Friday morning were relatively slow, with Jim Clark setting the benchmark in the low 1:30's. However, in the qualifying trails later that day, conditions improved allowing for faster times. Clark posted the fastest lap of a 1:26.0, which was significantly faster than that of second-placed Jim Palmer who set a time of 1:28.6. 

The qualifying process for the Trophy race was through two preliminary races, where the race times would determine the grid. In the first heat, Bruce McLaren took the win and subsequently pole position for the race with a race time of 16 minutes and 11.2 seconds. Clark won the second heat, with a time that put him in second place for the Trophy race.

Clark launched off the line, into what would be a demanding lead. On lap four, Rex Flowers retired from the race due to a burst oil pipe as well as a collapsed piston. It only took Clark six laps to begin lapping backmarkers and by this stage, his lead over McLaren was up to a comfortable five seconds. By lap 26, only four cars had not been lapped - Clark (the leader), McLaren, Gardner and Palmer. Phil Hill retired on that lap as a result of a broken half-shaft and by this stage, Abernethy was laps away from retiring himself due to persistent overheating issues with his Cooper. Two more drivers would fail to finish the race - Riley due to a broken universal and Lawrence after he ran out of fuel. Clark almost joined the casualty list after experiencing oil pressure problems laps away from the conclusion of the race. This meant that Clark had to lift and nurse the car home, allowing McLaren to claw back the gap. By this stage however, the gap was far too big. Clark took the win in dominant fashion, a much better result for Clark than his last Lady Wigram Trophy outing where he stalled the car after having spun off in the wet conditions.

Classification

References

Lady Wigram Trophy
Lady
January 1965 sports events in New Zealand